The 1971 Montana State Bobcats football team was an American football team that represented Montana State University in the Big Sky Conference during the 1971 NCAA College Division football season. In their first season under head coach Sonny Holland, the Bobcats compiled a 2–7–1 record (0–5–1 in Big Sky, last).

Home games were played on campus at Gatton Field in Bozeman, Montana; the stadium was razed following this season, and the site is now occupied by the Marga Hosaeus Fitness Center, opened in 1973.

Schedule

References

Montana State
Montana State Bobcats football seasons
Montana State Bobcats football